I Want to Be Like You is the first studio album from FFH on Essential Records following the release of six independent projects. It was released in 1998. The song "One of These Days" was featured on WOW #1s: 31 of the Greatest Christian Music Hits Ever. The album peaked at number 64 on the Billboard 200.

Track listing
 "One of These Days" - 4:25 (Jeromy Deibler)
 "Take Me as I Am" - 2:54 (Jeromy Deibler)
 "Fall to You" -4:09 (Jeromy Deibler)
 "I Want to Be Like You" - 3:53 (Jeromy Deibler)
 "I'm Alright" - 4:14 (Jeromy Deibler)
 "Big Fish" - 3:32 (Jeromy Deibler, Kathy Els)
 "Wholly to You" - 3:58 (Jeromy Deibler)
 "So Is His Love" - 3:44 (Rick Hansen)
 "Only You" - 3:50 (Jeromy Deibler, Scott Williamson)
 "Breathe in Me" - 3:58 (Jeromy Deibler)
 "Little Change" - 4:49 (Jeromy Deibler)
 "Power in His Blood" - 4:06 (Donna Smith, Jeromy Deibler)

Personnel 

FFH
 Jeromy Deibler – vocals
 Jennifer Deibler – vocals
 Brian Smith – vocals 
 Steve Croyle – vocals, guitar

Additional musicians
 Byron Hagan – organ (1-5, 10), keyboards (4, 8, 10, 11), acoustic piano (11)
 Jeffrey Roach – keyboards (7, 9)
 Jerry McPherson – guitars
 Jimmie Lee Sloas – bass (1, 3, 6, 8, 12)
 Jackie Street – bass (2, 4, 5, 7, 9, 10, 11)
 Scott Williamson – drums (1-4, 6-12)
 Steve Brewster – programming (1, 2, 3, 8, 10, 11, 12), loops (1, 2, 3, 8, 10, 11, 12), drums (5, 6)
 Shane Holloman – percussion (4, 7)

Production 
 Producer – Scott Williamson
 Executive Producers – Robert Beeson and Bob Wohler
 Engineers – Salvo (Tracks 1-9, 11 & 12); Randy Poole (Track 10).
 Recorded at The Bennett House (Franklin, TN) and Sixteenth Avenue Sound (Nashville, TN).
 Overdubbed by Randy Poole and Scott Williamson at Quad Studios and Black Dog Studio (Nashville, TN).
 Mixing – Salvo (Tracks 1, 2, 6, 10 & 12); Tom Laune (Tracks 3, 4, 5, 7, 8, 9 & 11).
 Mixed at Recording Arts (Nashville, TN) and Sound Kitchen (Franklin, TN).
 Edited by John Mayfield at Mayfield Mastering (Nashville, TN).
 Mastered by Hank Williams at MasterMix (Nashville, TN).
 Design – Michelle Kapp at Axis Media.
 Photography – Matthew Barnes

References

1998 albums
FFH (band) albums